Tobias Fölster (born 30 January 1994) is a German footballer who plays as a centre-back for SC Weiche 08.

Career
Fölster made his professional debut for TSV Havelse in the 3. Liga on 24 July 2021 against 1. FC Saarbrücken.

References

External links
 
 
 
 

1994 births
Living people
People from Kiel
Footballers from Schleswig-Holstein
German footballers
Association football goalkeepers
Hannover 96 II players
TSV Havelse players
SC Weiche Flensburg 08 players
3. Liga players
Regionalliga players